Thomas Salamon (born 18 January 1989) is an Austrian professional association football player. He plays as a midfielder for St. Pölten.

Club career
In Austria he played for Austria Wien Amateure, Mattersburg, Grödig, Austria Wien and SV Horn.

In 31 January 2020 he became a member of Lithuanian FK Sūduva Marijampolė. In 2020 A lyga he played 18 matches and scored two goals and made one assist.

He did not play in the first half 2021, because of an injury. In 16 June 2021 he left FK Sūduva.

On 17 June 2021 he returned to Austria and signed a one-year contract with St. Pölten.

References

1989 births
Living people
Austrian footballers
Austrian expatriate footballers
Association football midfielders
SV Mattersburg players
SV Grödig players
FK Austria Wien players
SV Horn players
FK Sūduva Marijampolė players
SKN St. Pölten players
Austrian Football Bundesliga players
2. Liga (Austria) players
A Lyga players
Austrian expatriate sportspeople in Lithuania
Expatriate footballers in Lithuania